The Samsung Galaxy M32 is an Android based smartphone manufactured by Samsung Electronics as part of the Samsung Galaxy M series. It was announced on 21 June 2021 for India and in July 2021 for other markets. Its key specifications include a 6.4 inch Super AMOLED display with 90 Hz refresh rate, and a quad-camera setup with a 64 MP main camera.

Specifications

Design 
The Samsung Galaxy M32 comes in Black and Light Blue colors. The phone's dimensions are 159.3 x 74 x 9.3 mm in the Indian variant, and 159.3 x 74 x 8.4 mm in other variants. The phone's weight is 196 grams in the Indian variant and 180 grams in other variants.

Hardware 
The Samsung Galaxy M32 has a 6.4 inch Super AMOLED display with 90 Hz refresh rate, 1080×2400 pixels resolution, 20:9 aspect ratio and ~411 ppi pixel density.  It is powered by MediaTek Helio G80 system-on-chip with an octa-core (2x2.0 GHz ARM Cortex-A75 & 6x1.8 GHz ARM Cortex-A55) CPU and a ARM Mali-G52 MC2 GPU. It comes with either 4 GB, 6 GB, or 8 GB of RAM and 64 GB or 128 GB of internal storage, which can be expanded up to 1 TB via the microSD card slot. It has a 6000 mAh Li-ion battery in the Indian variant, and a 5000 mAh Li-ion battery in other variants. The phone supports 25W fast charging but comes with a 15W fast charger.

Cameras 
The Samsung Galaxy M32 has a quad-camera setup with a 64 MP main camera, an 8 MP ultrawide camera, a 2 MP macro camera, and a 2 MP depth sensor. It also has a 20 MP front camera. Both the cameras can record 1080p video at 30 fps.

Software 
The Samsung Galaxy M32 comes preinstalled with Android 11 with One UI 3.1. This phone is eligible for Android 12 update.

See also 

 Samsung Galaxy M31
 Samsung Galaxy M series
 One UI

References 

Samsung smartphones
Mobile phones introduced in 2021
Samsung products
Mobile phones with multiple rear cameras